Grenoble City Hall is the seat of the city council in Grenoble, France.

The City Hall, on the edge of Paul Mistral Park, was built from 1965 to 1967 as part of preparations for the 1968 Winter Olympics. The main architect was Maurice Novarina, assisted by Jacques Giovannoni, Jacques Christin and Marcel Welti. It is built of steel, glass, aluminium and concrete. It replaced the Hôtel de Lesdiguières, the former government seat since 1719. The instructions for a new city hall came from the French state in 1962, and the chosen site was occupied by military buildings and part of the site of 1925's International Exhibition of Hydropower and Tourism. The building was opened on 18 December 1967 by interior minister Christian Fouchet, mayor Hubert Dubedout and sports minister François Missoffe.

The building's 12-storey tower requires foundations of 15 to 18 metres. Offices related to local government and the mayor are located on the ground floor, and those related to local services in the tower.

In March 2003, the building was one of several in Grenoble to be given the "Patrimoine du XXe siècle" (20th Century Heritage) status by the French state. In 2016, this status was succeeded by the similar "Architecture contemporaine remarquable" (Remarkable Contemporary Architecture).

In 2017, the City Hall was told that it failed modern fire regulations, particularly concerning its 12-storey tower and the potential fuel source of paper archives on the ground floor. In the early hours of September 2019, there was a fire in the council chamber, which authorities believed to be an act of arson.

References

City and town halls in France
Buildings and structures in Grenoble
Buildings and structures completed in 1967
20th-century architecture in France